NLive Radio is a local community radio station for Northampton, in the United Kingdom. It was originally founded as NNBC. The station is owned by the University of Northampton, and is operated with editorial independence with the aims to serve the town of Northampton.

History
In October 2016, the station launched on-air as a joint project between the community of Northampton and the University of Northampton, with the aim to provide a local radio service for everyone across Northampton, as well as help the University with its aim to serve its local community and be part of the cultural fabric of the town.

In September 2019, the station announced that Martin Steers had become the Station Manager with a vision to grow and develop the station.

In December 2019, the station released a version of Do They Know It's Christmas? in aid of the KidsAid charity. It also hosted political coverage of the results of the 2019 United Kingdom general election.

In March 2020, teenage-presenter Will Oelrich was nominated for a 'BBC Sounds Rising Talent 16-18' Young Audio award.

In July 2020 the station distributed free radio sets to vulnerable residents.

In June 2021 it was announced that the station had been successful in its application to extend its license by 5 years  the station also released an updated logo with a new strapline of "The station that loves Northampton".

In October 2022 the station celebrated 5 years as NLive Radio.

Transmitter
When the station launched as NNBC,  the transmitter was based at the University of Northampton Park campus, but was then moved to the University Innovation Centre in 2018, when the station relaunched as NLive.

References 

Community radio stations in the United Kingdom
Radio stations in Northamptonshire
2016 establishments in England
University of Northampton